Quickies is the twelfth studio album by The Magnetic Fields. The album consists of 28 songs, each of which is between 0:17 and 2:35 in length. For the album's conceit, Magnetic Fields singer and songwriter Stephin Merritt was influenced by the short fiction of Lydia Davis and the writing of his own book of Scrabble poetry.

Release 
Quickies is available as a box set of five 7" records or as a CD. The US release of the CD was delayed to June 19. A single LP release was done for Record Store Day of the same year, pressed on pink vinyl and featuring a bonus track on Side A - "The Witches' Fly".

Reception 

Quickies was met with generally positive reviews. At Metacritic, which assigns a weighted average rating out of 100 to reviews from professional publications, the album received an average score of 74, based on 11 reviews.

Marc Hogan from Pitchfork said that the album "thrives" on the shortness of its songs, and Slant Magazine stated that Merritt "[flourishes] under the constraints he sets for himself". In his Substack-published "Consumer Guide" column, Robert Christgau singled out the following tracks as highlights – "I Wish I Were a Prostitute Again", "My Stupid Boyfriend", "Come, Life, Shaker Life!", and "The Best Cup of Coffee in Tennessee" – and summarized the album as "28 songs in 48 minutes, too few as clever as you'd hope, several rather nice, more than that stupider than this very smart man believes".

Track listing

Personnel 
The Magnetic Fields
Stephin Merritt – ARP Axxe synthesizer, Veillette Avante 12-string acoustic guitar, banjoleles, cigar box ukulele, electric guitar, Mellotron, Moog instruments, Octave Cat synthesizer, unprogrammed drum machines, vocals
Sam Davol – wine box cello, Infinite Jets
Claudia Gonson – vocals, one-hand piano, cigar box percussion
Shirley Simms – vocals, three-chord autoharp, Omnichord
John Woo – unamplified electric guitar, cigar box guitar

Other Personnel
Chris Ewen – prepared piano, Mellotron
Benny Grotto – Optigan percussion
Daniel Handler – accordion, celeste
Pinky Weitzman – cigar box violin, Stroh violin

Charts

References 

Nonesuch Records albums
The Magnetic Fields albums
2020 albums